The salterio mexicano is a string instrument, with origins in the 16th century psaltery. It is manufactured with woods forming a trapezoidal box. On the top board, 5 bridges are placed in order to seat stretched metal strings across from side to side. The strings are plucked with a metal pick adjusted on the index finger of each hand.

There are salterios of various sizes, up to one meter long, with tessitura of tenor, soprano and requinto. The salterio requinto has 90 strings in 3 course,  with a range from Si4 to Fa#9. The  salterio tenor has more than 100 strings in 3-4 course order, with a range from Si3 to Fa#8.

References
(1988). Instituto Nacional de Antropología e Historia. Atlas Cultural de México. Música. Grupo Editorial Planeta.

External links
Video
Article in Spanish discusses history and use of salterio in Mexico.

Box zithers
Mexican musical instruments